Mathume Joseph Phaahla (born 11 July 1957) is a South African politician currently serving as Minister of Health in South Africa. He holds a medical degree and was previously the Deputy Minister of Health, Deputy Minister of Rural Development and Land Reform, and Deputy Minister of Arts and Culture.

Career
Phaahla studied for a Bachelor of Medicine and Bachelor of Surgery at the University of Natal. It was at university that Phaahla became a member of the Students Representative Council from 1979 to 1981. The following year in 1980, he served as an Executive Member of the Release Mandela Campaign Committee in KwaZulu-Natal. Phaahla was also a founding member of the Azanian Students' Organisation (AZASO) at its inaugural Conference in Wilgespruit, Johannesburg, in 1981. At the conference Phaahla was elected President of AZASO, a post he held until 1983, when the South African Students Congress (SASCO) was formed as a breakaway from AZASO. He formed part of the executive of SASCO together with Dr Aaron Motsoaledi, the late Dr P Sefularo, Samantha Chetty and Tiego Moseneke. During that year, he joined the United Democratic Front (UDF) in KwaZulu-Natal and was elected as its Secretary.

After completing his studies at the University of Natal, he became a Senior Medical Officer and Superintendent at Mapulaneng Hospital between 1987 and 1990. He subsequently became a Medical Superintendent at St Rita's Hospital in Glew Cowie, Limpopo in 1990. Phaahla went to Israel in 1992 where he studied for a Diploma in Health Service Management at the University of Haifa, Institute of Science and a Certificate of General Management, Marketing and Finance. Other capacities that Phaahla has served in include being Director of Medical Services of the Department of Health in 1993 and 1994 in the former Lebowa homeland.

He was a member of the Provincial Legislature in the Northern Province from 1994 until 1997. Phaahla was a Member of the Executive Council for Education, Art, Culture and Sport in the Northern Cape Provincial Government from 1997 to 2000. Within the same period, he was appointed the MEC for Health and Welfare Northern Province.

In 2000, he was appointed the Chief Executive Officer of the South African Sports Commission. He was appointed the Director-General in the Department of Sport and Recreation responsible for organising the 2010 FIFA World Cup until 10 May 2009. On 11 May 2009, he was appointed the Deputy Minister of Rural Development and Land Reform in South Africa. In October 2010 he was appointed Deputy Minister of Arts and Culture.

References

External links
 

Living people
Government ministers of South Africa
1957 births
People from Lepelle-Nkumpi Local Municipality
University of Natal alumni
Members of the National Assembly of South Africa